The 1997 FIVB World Grand Prix was the fifth women's volleyball tournament of its kind. It was held over four weeks in eight cities throughout Asia, cumulating with the final round in Kobe, Japan, from 29 to 31 August 1997.

Preliminary rounds

Ranking
The best three teams from the overall ranking and Japan as host are qualified for the final round.

First round

Group A
Venue: Macau

|}

Group B
Venue: Suwon, South Korea

|}

Second round

Group C
Venue: Taipei, Taiwan

|}

Group D
Venue: Hong Kong

|}

Third round (extra)

Group E
Venue: Gifu, Japan

|}

Final round
Venue: Kobe, Japan

|}

Final ranking

|}

Final standings

Individual awards

Most Valuable Player:

Best Scorer:

Best Spiker:

Best Blocker:

Best Server:

Best Setter:

Best Digger:

Dream Team

Setter: 

Middle Blockers:

Outside Hitters:

Opposite Spiker:

References
Results

FIVB World Grand Prix
1997 in Japanese sport
International volleyball competitions hosted by Japan
1997